The 2008–09 Utah Utes men's basketball team represented the University of Utah during the 2008–09 NCAA Division I men's basketball season. They played their home games at the Jon M. Huntsman Center in Salt Lake City, Utah, United States, and were a member of the Mountain West Conference. The Utes were led by second-year head coach Jim Boylen. They finished the season 24–10 (12–4 in Mountain West play) and won the 2009 Mountain West Conference men's basketball tournament to earn an automatic bid to the NCAA tournament. As No. 5 seed in the Midwest region, Utah lost to Arizona in the Round of 64.

Roster

Schedule and results 

|-
!colspan=9 style=| Non-Conference Regular season

|-
!colspan=9 style=| MWC Regular season

|-
!colspan=9 style=| MWC tournament

|-
!colspan=9 style=| NCAA tournament

Rankings

References 

Utah
Utah Utes men's basketball seasons
Utah
Utah Utes
Utah Utes